Events in the year 2018 in Equatorial Guinea.

Incumbents
 President: Teodoro Obiang Nguema Mbasogo 
 Prime Minister: Francisco Pascual Obama Asue

Events

Sport
26 May – season start of the 2018 Equatoguinean Primera División (the top-tier football league)

Deaths

 1 July – Anacleto Sima Ngua, Roman Catholic prelate, Bishop of Bata (b. 1936).

References

 
2010s in Equatorial Guinea 
Years of the 21st century in Equatorial Guinea 
Equatorial Guinea 
Equatorial Guinea